Miguel Guzmán Miranda (born 8 April 1996) is a Mexican professional footballer who plays as a winger.

Personal life 
Guzmán Miranda is the son of former Mexican football player Daniel Guzmán.

External links
 

Living people
1996 births
Mexican footballers
Association football forwards
Leones Negros UdeG footballers
Atlético San Luis footballers
C.D. Tepatitlán de Morelos players
Loros UdeC footballers
Tampico Madero F.C. footballers
Ascenso MX players
Liga Premier de México players
Tercera División de México players
Footballers from Guadalajara, Jalisco